Khairatabad railway station is located in Hyderabad, Telangana, India. Localities like Somajiguda, Saifabad and Banjara Hills are accessible from this station.

Lines
Multi-Modal Transport System, Hyderabad
Secunderabad–Falaknuma route (FS Line)

References

External links
 MMTS Timings as per South Central Railway

MMTS stations in Hyderabad
Secunderabad railway division